The Swedish general strike of August 4 to September 6, 1909, was a general work stoppage by over 300,000 individuals all over Sweden. It was the first major conflict between the Swedish Trade Union Confederation, and the Swedish Employers Association. The losses to employers was estimated to be around 25 million Swedish kronor.

Recession was having a negative impact on many companies and the SAF therefore wanted to lower wages. A lockout of 80,000 workers in the textile-, sawmill- and pulp industry was put in effect. The LO answered with a call for general strike. Only healthcare workers and a few other skeleton professions were exempt from the strike.

Funds were short and forced the union to end the strike after a month, resulting in major membership losses. The LO lost almost half of its members, some to the newly formed anarcho-syndicalist Central Organisation of the Workers of Sweden.  The anarcho-syndicalists argued that the management of the LO had handled the strike half-heartedly and only started it to curb its members' more radical stance. Employers also took the opportunity to lay off approximately 20,000 workers, which also contributed to mass defections from LO when workers were forced to leave the union to keep their jobs. Emigration also rose as a consequence of the strike.

The failure of the general strike formed an important backdrop to the Saltsjöbaden Agreement of 1938.

References

External links 
 Tony Cliff, Patterns of mass strike

1909 labor disputes and strikes
General strikes in Europe
Labor history
Swedish Trade Union Confederation
Social history of Sweden
1909 in Sweden
Labor in Sweden
August 1909 events
September 1909 events